Glen Eyre may refer to:
 Glen Eyre Halls of Residence, a hall of residence of the University of Southampton
 Glen Eyre High School, a former school in Southampton since replaced by Cantell School

See also 
 Glen Eyrie, an 1871 Tudor-style castle in Colorado Springs, Colorado, US